Earth Clock is a computer program that will display a map of the Earth showing the zones where is day and where is night. It was released by Xentax Foundation on February 7, 2004, and programmed by Arjan Dikhoff. Its source code can be found at SourceForge.

References

Clocks